Delhi Safdarjung railway station is a small railway station in Safdarjung which is a residential and commercial neighborhood of the South Delhi district of Delhi. Its code is DSJ. The station is part of Delhi Suburban Railway. The station consist of three platforms.

The railway land development authority headquarters is situated here, moreover one can reach AIIMS Delhi from here easily.
There is a plan to make this station A1 category and one of those to maintain the increasing load on Nizamuddin & Delhi Cantt.

Trains 

 Patalkot Express
 Durg–Jammu Tawi Superfast Express
 Indore–Jammu Tawi Weekly Superfast Express
 Tirupati–Jammu Tawi Humsafar Express
 Ramayana Express

See also

 Hazrat Nizamuddin railway station
 New Delhi railway station
 Delhi Junction railway station
 Anand Vihar Terminal railway station
 Delhi Sarai Rohilla railway station
 Delhi Metro

References 

Railway stations in South Delhi district
Delhi railway division
Transport in Delhi